McClory is a surname. Notable people with the surname include:

Allan McClory (1899–1983), Scottish footballer
Belinda McClory (born 1968), Australian actor
Kevin McClory (1924–2006), Irish screenwriter, film producer and director
Robert McClory (1908–1988), American politician
Robert J. McClory (born 1963), American Catholic bishop
Sean McClory (1924–2003), Irish actor